Dennis Pell (19 April 1929 – 2003) was an English professional footballer who played as a winger.

References

1929 births
2003 deaths
Sportspeople from Normanton, West Yorkshire
English footballers
Association football wingers
Methley F.C. players
Rotherham United F.C. players
Grimsby Town F.C. players
Frickley Athletic F.C. players
English Football League players